Boujenah may refer to :
 Matthieu Boujenah (1976-), a French comedian, nephew of Michel and Paul Boujenah 
 Michel Boujenah (1952-), a Tunisian Jewish comedian
 Paul Boujenah (1958-), a Tunisian film director, brother of Michel Boujenah